Thomas Fincke (6 January 1561 – 24 April 1656) was a Danish  mathematician and physicist, and a professor at the University of Copenhagen for more than 60 years.

Biography
 
Thomas Jacobsen Fincke was born in Flensburg in Schleswig.
Fincke was the son of Councillor Jacob Fincke  and Anna Thorsmede. He completed his primary schooling at Flensburg.  From 1577, he studied mathematics, rhetoric and other philosophical studies for five years  at the University of Strasbourg.

Fincke's lasting achievement is found in his book Geometria rotundi (1583), in which he introduced the modern names of the trigonometric functions tangent and secant. In 1590, he became professor of mathematics at the University of Copenhagen. In 1603 he also obtained a professorship in medicine.

Personal life
He was married to Ivaria  Jungesdatter Ivers (1574-1614).
His son Jacob Fincke (1592-1663) was a professor of physics.
His daughters married scientist  Caspar Bartholin the Elder (1585–1629), botanist Jørgen Fuiren (1581-1628),  historian   Ole Worm (1588-1654)  and theologian Hans Brochmand (1594-1630).

Fincke died at Copenhagen and was buried  at Vor Frue Kirke.

References

External links
 

1561 births
1656 deaths
16th-century Danish scientists
17th-century Danish scientists
16th-century Danish mathematicians
17th-century Danish mathematicians
Danish mathematicians
Danish physicists
Science teachers
Mathematics writers
University of Strasbourg alumni
Academic staff of the University of Copenhagen
Rectors of the University of Copenhagen
People from Flensburg
Burials at the Church of Our Lady, Copenhagen